Jacarea is a clade of caimans within the subfamily Caimaninae.  Jacarea was first named by Norell in 1988 to include the extant species within the genera Caiman and Melanosuchus, while excluding the dwarf caiman genus Paleosuchus. In 1999, Brochu formally cladistically defined Jacarea as the last common ancestor of Caiman latirosris (Broad-snouted caiman), Caiman crocodilus (Spectacled caiman), Caiman yacare (Yacare caiman), Melanosuchus niger (Black caiman), and all its descendants. Molecular DNA phylogenetic studies recover Paleosuchus as outside of Jacarea, although morphological studies are inconsistent.

The cladogram below shows the results of the strict consensus phylogenetic analysis of the 2020 Cicade et al. study:

References

Alligatoridae